Cyrus Washington born 28 October 1983) is an American kickboxer, Taekwondo, Muay Thai and Lethwei fighter. He is former WKA, WMF, WKBF and PK-1 Muay Thai World Champion, as well as former WBC Muaythai USA Champion, WMC and Lumpinee Stadium Title contender. In 2012, he competed in the Emmy nominated Thailand VS Challenger TV Series. Washington received worldwide attention for being one of the first successful foreigners to compete in Lethwei in Myanmar.

Early life 
Washington started training Japanese Kendo at a young age and boxed as an amateur. At 10 years old, he got enrolled in Taekwondo, under WTF Taekwondo, and trained consistently until becoming an elite competitor in the state in Michigan. Washington is now a 3rd degree black belt in Taekwondo. In 7th grade, when his teacher asked him what he wanted to be when he grew up. Washington replied: “A kickboxer”.

Career

Muaythai 
On February 22, 2010, Washington scored a 1st-round knockout against rising Muaythai star Harlee Por.Pramuk winning the Pk-1 Championship Belt at Patong Boxing Stadium in Phuket, Thailand.

On December 29, 2010, as he was moving up in the ranks, Washington faced 5-times World Muay thai Champion Jomhod Kiatadisak in Phuket, Thailand. Washington went full 5-rounds with the Muay thai legend losing the fight on points to a close decision.

On 6 April 2011, Washington faced Cosmo Alexandre in a Super Fight bout for Battle in the Desert II in Primm, Nevada organized by the Lion Fight Promotions. Alexandre won the fight by decision.

On April 28, 2012, Washington faced Ky Hollenbeck at the Legends Muay Thai Championship in San Francisco, California. Hollenbeck won on with a vicious spinning elbow knockout in round one to take the WMC Intercontinental Middleweight (-72.58 kg/160 lb) belt.

On 21 December 2019, Washington faced Thai Fight Champion Tengnueng Sitjaesairoong and lost by on points.

As of 2013, Washington was ranked #5 Middleweight in the world by Muaythai Authority.

Enfusion 
In 2010, Washington participate in the first Enfusion Reality TV show called Test of the Champions, a professional kickboxing show produced by It's Showtime in the Koh Samui, Thailand.

WBC Title 
On 22 October 2011, Washington faced Stephen Richards at Bangkok Fight Night 11 in Atlanta, Georgia with the WBC Muay Thai National Super Middleweight title on the line. The fight was declared a majority draw and no one walked away with the title.

On 7 September 2013, Washington faced Marcus Fisher the Warriors Cup XVIII event in New Jersey, USA for the WBC Middleweight National Title. Washington was declared the winner by unanimous decision and claimed the WBC Super Middleweight US National Title.

On 14 June 2014, Washington faced Brett Hlavacek and lost the title via unanimous Decision.

WKA Championship 
On 13 December 2013, Washington faced James Martinez, who represented the United States at The Contender Asia. The fight took place on Take-On Productions in New York with the WKA Welterweight World Championship on the line. Washington claimed the title after knocking out Martinez via spinning back kick to the stomach in the second round.

The Challenger Muay Thai 
In 2012, Washington competed in the Thailand based reality television series Thailand VS Challenger broadcast on AXN Network in Asia. The show was nominated for the International Emmy Award for Best Non-Scripted Entertainment. The show was a follow up to Stephan Fox's The Contender Asia.

Freedom Muaythai 
On July 6, 2022, Washington faced Hungarian Muaythai Champion Joni Mate in the main event at Freedom 6 in Yonkers, New York. Washington won by TKO in the first round to capture the Freedom World Light Heavyweight title.

Lethwei

Lethwei Debut 
On 26 September 2010, Washington made his Lethwei debut facing Saw Nga Man who was the Openweight champion at the time. During the fight, Washington landed a powerful elbow on Saw Nga Man. The Burmese then avoided engagement trying to protect his swollen eye from more damage. With no stoppage, the fight ended in a draw according to Traditional rules Lethwei.

Tun Tun Min trilogy 
A few months before their first fight where Tun Tun Min had beaten Saw Nga Man for the openweight title.
Their first meeting was on December 7, 2014 at the inaugural Air KBZ sponsored Aung Lan Championship. In a stunning upset Washington knocked out Tun Tun Min in round three in spectacular fashion. Even after using his time-out Tun Tun Min could no longer continue. Because the bout was considered an exhibition match, the openweight title was not at stake.

The rematch took place 4 months later on April 11, 2015 at Thuwunna National Indoor Stadium in Yangon. Cyrus was once again able to knock out Tun Tun Min with a spinning technique. Unlike in their first fight Tun Tun Min was able to recover during his timeout and eventually knock Cyrus down in the 5th round prompting the corner to throw in the towel. Cyrus later explained that there was some confusion about the rules. He tried to call for a timeout, but according to the official rules you cannot use one in the last round and resulted in the towel being thrown.

On December 20, 2015, Tun Tun Min faced Cyrus Washington at the second Air KBZ Aung Lan Championship, for their third and final fight. The fight ended quickly and Tun Tun Min struck Cyrus on the eye socket. After taking his timeout Cyrus made clear that he did not want to continue, and the match was stopped declaring Tun Tun Min the victor after just 71 seconds. After the fight many fans were displeased with how the fight concluded and threw bottles and other items into the ring.

Facing Too Too 
After facing going 1-1 versus Tun Tun Min, Washington campaigned to fight more Burmese Lethwei Champions and he was set to face Lethwei Champion Too Too in July 2015.

On 26 July 2015, Washington faced Too Too inside the Thein Pyu Stadium in Yangon under traditional Lethwei rules. Before the fight both men had agreed to a potentiel extension of the fight in case the fight went into a draw. The match went for seven rounds rather than the sport's typical five. The fight ended in a draw, but both fighters said did not want to fight for this long again. Cyrus was set to face Tun Tun Min in December for a third and deciding grudge match.

Challenging Leduc 
Washington and Dave Leduc being the only two fighter to have stopped knockout artist Tun Tun Min, during Leduc's rise in Lethwei, fans often entertained the idea of a match between the two foreigners. In 2017, Washington officially challenged Leduc, who agreed to a challenge under traditional Lethwei rules.

On August 20, 2017, Washington faced Leduc inside the Thuwunna National Indoor Stadium in Yangon, Myanmar, at the occasion of Myanmar Lethwei World Championship. With over 100 fights to his record, Washington was the more experienced fighter of the two with Leduc having only 22 fights. Thought Leduc dominated by applying pressure, drawing blood, and backing his opponent down, the fight was declared a draw under traditional Lethwei rules marking Leduc's fourth title defense in eight months.

On 7 November 2020, Washington is challenging Dave Leduc for the second and final time to determine who is the best foreign Lethwei fighter. They will fight traditional Lethwei rules in Cheyenne, Wyoming inside a cage. Leduc won the fight by TKO.

Controversies 
On September 10, 2011, Washington was scheduled to face Dave Zuniga in Winnipeg, Canada for the IKF Intercontinental Middleweight Championship. However, due legal issues and pending charges, Washington was refused entry into Canada the Thursday prior to the event.

On 22 July 2018, Washington was involved in a shooting while working security at a Houston nightclub. He suffered gun shot wounds to his lower abdomen and the bullet exited his leg.

Personal life 
Washington now lives in Houston, Texas with his children.

Championships and accomplishments 

Muay Thai & Kickboxing

 World Boxing Council (WBC)
 WBC American Middleweight Champion
 World Kickboxing Association (WKA) 
 2013 WKA Welterweight World Champion
 World Muaythai Federation (WMF)
 WMF Super Middleweight World Champion
 World Kickboxing Federation (WKBF)
 WKBF Middleweight World Champion
 United States Muay Thai Association (USMTA)
 2015 USMTA US Champion
 PK-1 Muay Thai
 2009-2011 Thailand Champion
 Lumpinee Stadium
 2017 Lumpinee Stadium Light heavyweight Title Contender (−77 kg)
 Thailand VS Challenger TV Series
 Competitor on Team Challenger Awards, records, and honours  Lethwei Competed in the first Lethwei World Championship title fight in North America 
 Magazines 2010 Featured in Penthouse Magazine
 2010 Featured in the Muay Siam Magazine

 Lethwei record 

|-  style="background:#fbb;"
| 2020-11-07 || Loss ||align=left| Dave Leduc || Sparta Wyoming IV || Cheyenne, Wyoming, United States || TKO || 4 || 2:40
|-
! style=background:white colspan=9 |
|-  style="background:#c5d2ea;"
| 2017-08-20 || Draw ||align=left| Dave Leduc || 2017 Myanmar Lethwei World Championship || Yangon, Myanmar || Draw || 5 || 3:00
|-
! style=background:white colspan=9 |
|-  style="background:#fbb;"
| 2015-12-20 || Loss ||align=left| Tun Tun Min || 2015 Air KBZ Aung Lan Championship || Yangon, Myanmar || TKO || 1 ||
|- style="background:#c5d2ea;" |-
| 2015-07-26 || Draw || align="left" | Too Too || Monsoon Fight || Yangon, Myanmar || Draw || 7 || 3:00
|-  style="background:#fbb;"
| 2015-04-11 || Loss ||align=left| Tun Tun Min || Thingyan Fight 2015 || Yangon, Myanmar || TKO || 5 ||
|-  style="background:#cfc;"
| 2014-12-07 || Win ||align=left| Tun Tun Min || 2014 Air KBZ Aung Lan Championship || Yangon, Myanmar || KO (spinning heel kick) || 3 ||
|- style="background:#c5d2ea;" |-
| 2010-09-26 || Draw|| align="left" | Saw Nga Man || International Lethwei Challenge Fights || Yangon, Myanmar || Draw || 5 || 3:00
|-
| colspan=9 | Legend:    

 Muay Thai record 

|-  style="background:#fbb;"
| 2022-09-17|| Win ||align=left| Adrien Rubis || Freedomfighter: Freedom 7 || New York City, New York || Decision (split) || 5 || 3:00
|-
! style=background:white colspan=9 |{{small|For the Freedom Light Heavyweight World Championship
|-  style="background:#cfc;"
| 2022-07-06|| Win ||align=left| Joni Mate || Freedomfighter: Freedom 6 || Yonkers, New York || TKO || 1 ||
|-
! style=background:white colspan=9 |
|-  style="background:#fbb;"
| 2019-12-21|| Loss ||align=left| Tengnueng Sitjaesairoong || THAI FIGHT: Thai Fest in Patong || Phuket, Thailand || Decision || 3 ||
|-
! style=background:white colspan=9 |
|-  style="background:#cfc;"
| 2015-10-11 || Win ||align=left| Ngoohaopetch Sor.Jor.Surapoj || Max Muay Thai || Bangkok, Thailand || KO || 2 ||
|-  style="background:#cfc;"
| 2014-07-19 || Win ||align=left| JR Hines || Take On Productions || New York, United States || TKO || 1 ||
|-  style="background:#fbb;"
| 2014-06-14 || Loss ||align=left| Brett Hlavacek || Warriors Cup XVII || San Francisco, California ||Decision || 5 ||
|-
! style=background:white colspan=9 |
|-  style="background:#cfc;"
| 2013-12-13 || Win ||align=left| James Martinez || Take-On Productions || New York, United States || KO (spinning back kick) || 2 ||
|-
! style=background:white colspan=9 |
|- style="background:#fbb;"
| 2013-11-03 || Loss ||align=left| Yi Long || 2013 in Wu Lin Feng || Las Vegas, USA || Decision || 3 ||
|-  style="background:#cfc;"
| 2013-09-07 || Win ||align=left| Marcus Fisher || Warriors Cup XVIII || San Francisco, California, United States || Decision || 5 ||
|-
! style=background:white colspan=9 |
|-  style="background:#cfc;"
| 2013-04-06 || Win ||align=left| Strahinja Ivanovic  || Warriors cup XV || San Francisco, California || Decision || 5 ||
|-  style="background:#cfc;"
| 2013-07-28 || Win ||align=left| JR Hines || Take On XXI || New York, United States || KO (spinning back kick) || 1 ||
|-
! style=background:white colspan=9 |
|-  style="background:#fbb;"
| 2012-04-28 || Loss ||align=left| Ky Hollenbeck || Legends Muay Thai Championship || San Francisco, California, United States || KO || 1 ||
|-
! style=background:white colspan=9 |
|-  style="background:#fbb;"
| 2011-12-23 || Loss ||align=left| Nieky Holzken || Klaar Om Te Bossen 3 || Paramaribo, Suriname || TKO (Cut) || 2 ||
|-  style="background:#cfc;"
|-  style="background:#c5d2ea;"
| 2011-10-22 || Draw ||align=left| Stephen Richards || Bangkok Fight Night 11  || Atlanta, Georgia || Draw || 5 ||
|-
! style=background:white colspan=9 |
|- style="background:#fbb;"
| 2011-07-23 || Loss ||align=left| Kaoklai Kaennorsing || Thailand Versus Challenger Series 2011 || Bangkok, Thailand || TKO || 3 ||
|-  style="background:#cfc;"
| 2011-06-23 || Win ||align=left| Hong Guang || Wu Lin Feng 2011 - USA vs China || Zhengzhou, China || KO (spinning heel kick) || 1 ||
|-  style="background:#fbb;"
| 2011-05-14 || Loss ||align=left| Cosmo Alexandre || Lion Fight: Battle in the Desert II || Primm, Nevada || Decision || 5 ||
|-  style="background:#cfc;"
| 2011-04-05 || Win ||align=left| Thahan Chai || Patong Boxing Stadium || Phuket, Thailand || TKO || 1 ||
|-  style="background:#cfc;"
| 2011-03-28 || Win ||align=left| Densakaw || Patong Boxing Stadium || Phuket, Thailand || KO || 1 ||
|-  style="background:#fbb;"
| 2010-12-29 || Loss ||align=left| Jomhod Kiatadisak || Bangla Stadium || Phuket, Thailand || Decision || 5 ||
|-  style="background:#cfc;"
| 2010-09-21 || Win ||align=left| Chalermchai || Patong Boxing Stadium || Phuket, Thailand || KO (spinning back kick)|| 3 ||
|-  style="background:#cfc;"
| 2010-07-01 || Win ||align=left| Chaiyo Thalangyanyeung || Patong Boxing Stadium || Phuket, Thailand || KO || 3 ||
|-  style="background:#cfc;"
| 2010-05-05 || Win ||align=left| Yodtawan || Bangla Stadium || Phuket, Thailand || KO || 1 ||
|-  style="background:#cfc;"
| 2010-02-22 || Win ||align=left| Harlee Por. Pramuk || Patong Boxing Stadium || Phuket, Thailand || KO (spinning back kick) || 2 ||
|-
! style=background:white colspan=9 |
|-  style="background:#cfc;"
| 2009-07-23 || Win ||align=left| Thaharneak || Patong Boxing Stadium || Phuket, Thailand || KO || 1 ||
|-  style="background:#cfc;"
| 2009-06-21 || Win ||align=left| Banyat || Patong Boxing Stadium || Phuket, Thailand || KO || 3 ||
|-  style="background:#cfc;"
| 2009-05-04 || Win ||align=left| Komsorn || Patong Boxing Stadium || Phuket, Thailand || KO (spinning back kick) || 2 ||
|-  style="background:#cfc;"
| 2008-10-17 || Win ||align=left| Anurak || Patong Boxing Stadium || Phuket, Thailand || KO || 1 || 
|-  style="background:#cfc;"
| 2008-02-16 || Win ||align=left| Chung Noi || Suwit Boxing Stadium || Phuket, Thailand || KO (spinning back kick) || 1 ||
|-  style="background:#cfc;"
| 2008-01-12 || Win ||align=left| Tonphet || Patong Boxing Stadium || Phuket, Thailand || KO || 1 ||
|-
| colspan=9 | Legend''':

References

External links
 
 
 

1983 births
Living people
Sportspeople from Saginaw, Michigan
American male kickboxers
Kickboxers from Michigan
Welterweight kickboxers
Middleweight kickboxers
Light heavyweight kickboxers
American Lethwei practitioners
American male taekwondo practitioners